Morpheus is a fictional character in The Matrix franchise. He is portrayed by Laurence Fishburne in the first three films, and in the video game The Matrix: Path of Neo, where he was the only original actor to reprise his character's voice. In The Matrix Resurrections, an AI program based on him is portrayed by Yahya Abdul-Mateen II.

Concept and creation
Lana and Lilly Wachowski, the creators of The Matrix franchise, instructed Fishburne to base his performance on Morpheus, a character in Neil Gaiman's comic book series The Sandman. At the studio's request, Gaiman later wrote "Goliath", a promotional short story set in the film's universe.

The name Morpheus is that of the god of dreams in Greek mythology, which is consistent with the character's involvement with the "dreaming" of the Matrix. The mythical Morpheus and his family, including two brothers (Phobetor and Phantasos), lived in a dream world protected by the Gates of Morpheus with two monsters standing guard. Beyond the gates were the River of Forgetfulness, beside which Morpheus once carried his father to hide in a cave, and the River of Oblivion.  This theme of duality carries over to Morpheus in The Matrix, who offers Neo either a blue pill (to forget about the Matrix and continue to live in the world of illusion) or a red pill (to enter the painful world of reality).

Fishburne did not reprise his role in the 2021 The Matrix Resurrections film. He stated that, "I am not in the next Matrix movie, and you'd have to ask Lana Wachowski why, because I don't have an answer for that". Both Vulture and Polygon highlighted that the recasting of Morpheus might imply that Matrix transmedia (such as The Matrix Online) remains part of the canon.

Overview
In the Matrix films, Morpheus is the captain of the Nebuchadnezzar, which is a hovercraft of the human forces of the last human city, Zion, in a devastated world where most humans are grown by sentient machines to be used as power sources and their minds kept imprisoned in the Matrix, a virtual computer-generated world, to stop them from realising the truth of the real world. Morpheus was once a human living inside the Matrix until he was freed.

Morpheus is apparently a very popular public figure in the city of Zion. He is also known in the Matrix, but as a dangerous terrorist wanted by 'Agents', who appear to be Federal agents, but are actually sentient computer programs that patrol the Matrix, eliminating any threat to it. Like other hovercraft crews, Morpheus and his crew are dedicated to the protection of Zion and the freeing of humans from the Matrix.

Earlier in his life, Morpheus gained the romantic attention of Niobe, another hovercraft captain. Their relationship became estranged shortly after Morpheus visited the Oracle, an ally living in the Matrix, who told Morpheus that he would be the person who would find the One, a person with superhuman abilities within the Matrix who could end the human/machine war. Since that visit, Morpheus has spent much of his life searching the Matrix for the One.

Personality
In The Matrix and The Matrix Reloaded, Morpheus was known to be a truly inspirational leader and influential teacher to many people, particularly the majority of his crew, to the extent that Tank commented that "Morpheus was a father to them, as well as a leader". In The Matrix Revolutions, with Morpheus's faith in the prophecy shattered, he does not appear as strong a leader or character as he was in the first two films, he comes across as subdued and defeated. Despite his strong faith, Morpheus still showed some rationality in dangerous situations rather than blindly relying on his beliefs to see him through the current crisis; perhaps his only truly irrational decision was to attack Agent Smith while unarmed in order to give Neo a chance to escape.

Character history

The Matrix
In the first feature film, The Matrix, Morpheus successfully finds and monitors a man named Thomas A. Anderson, a hacker who calls himself Neo. Despite a close call with Agents that capture, interrogate, and place a surveillance device on Neo, Morpheus and his crew locate him. Morpheus offers Neo a choice of ingesting a red pill, which will activate a trace program to locate Neo's body in the real world and allow the Nebuchadnezzar crew to extract him, or a blue pill, which will leave Neo in the Matrix to live and believe as he wishes. Neo takes the red pill. The Nebuchadnezzar crew is then able to eject Neo's body from the Matrix power plant and retrieve him from the cold sewers beneath the Earth's surface. Morpheus takes a risk in helping Neo escape the Matrix, as human minds that live too long in the Matrix may have trouble in comprehending the reality. Initially, Neo does experience denial when Morpheus explains the truth, a point for which Morpheus apologises.

Shortly after Neo visits the Oracle, Morpheus is captured by agents who plan to hack into his mind. Because Morpheus, as a hovercraft captain, possesses access codes to the Zion mainframe computer, the surviving members of the ship's crew are about to unplug Morpheus from the Matrix, without reconnecting his mind and body, a process that will kill him. Neo and Trinity, however, reenter the Matrix to make a daring and successful rescue of Morpheus. Neo saves Trinity from a helicopter crash, confirming Morpheus' belief that Neo is indeed the One.

Neo is eventually killed by Agent Smith shortly after the rescue, but revived as the One and returned to the Nebuchadnezzar before the Machines' Sentinels can destroy the ship.

The Matrix Reloaded
In the second film, The Matrix Reloaded, Morpheus is more confident that the war is nearing its end. A spiritual as well as an influential leader, Morpheus convinces one hovercraft ship to stay in the Matrix to await contact from the Oracle, despite orders from Zion for all ships to return to the city.  Here he incurs the wrath of Jason Locke, commander of the Zion defensive forces; but Morpheus' actions are defended by Councillor Hamann, a member of the city's ruling body.

With the aid of Trinity and Niobe, Morpheus successfully retrieves the Keymaker, an exiled program that can access many hidden areas of the Matrix, including the Source, the central Machine City mainframe computer and programming heart of the Matrix. Morpheus aids Neo in successfully entering the door to the Source before returning to the Nebuchadnezzar.

After Neo enters the Source and returns from the Matrix with new information, he tells Morpheus that the Prophecy was a system of control that would bring the One to the Source to disseminate the programming inside Neo into the Matrix to allow a reload of the Matrix while Zion is destroyed by the machines and rebuilt by the One and red pills. A sudden Sentinel attack destroys the Nebuchadnezzar, further damaging Morpheus' belief in the outcome of the war. Upon witnessing the destruction of his ship, he quotes the Biblical Nebuchadnezzar; "I have dreamed a dream... but now that dream has gone from me."

The crew is rescued by the hovercraft Mjolnir commanded by Captain Roland, who joins forces with the craft Logos commanded by Niobe.

The Matrix Revolutions
In the third film, The Matrix Revolutions, Morpheus is somewhat dispirited, and has problems in understanding now what may happen to Zion and its people. Now without a ship of his own, he and Link (the Nebuchadnezzar's Operator) reside on the hovercraft Mjolnir, commanded by Roland. Morpheus renews his conviction that Neo could still save Zion, and supports Trinity in finding Neo, whose mind is trapped in a computer netherworld called Mobil Avenue, despite not being jacked in. Morpheus is called to the Oracle with Trinity, and with the Oracle's guardian, Seraph, he helps Trinity rescue Neo, via a visit to the Merovingian's lair and a Mexican standoff.

Morpheus says farewell to Neo and Trinity before they leave for the Machine City in the hovercraft Logos to stop the war. Morpheus then aids Niobe as she flies the Mjolnir in a desperate ride back to Zion. The ship successfully stops the first onslaught of the Machine attack with the ship's electromagnetic pulse weapon.

When the Sentinels suddenly stop a second wave of attacks, Morpheus realizes that Neo is somehow fighting for them. When the Sentinels retreat after Neo defeats the former Agent Smith, now a virus that has threatened both humans and machines, Morpheus and Niobe embrace in celebration as cheers arise from the Zion population, who have received a brokered peace through Neo's sacrifice.

Of the original Nebuchadnezzar crew in the Matrix,  Morpheus is the only surviving member to see freedom for Zion.

Referring to the subjectivity of reality throughout the film trilogy, Morpheus' last line in The Matrix Revolutions, said in disbelief as the Sentinels retreat from Zion, is "Is this real?".

The Matrix Resurrections

In the fourth film The Matrix Resurrections, a new version of Morpheus, originally a program subconsciously created by a suppressed Neo as part of a modal based upon his memories, is released by Bugs from the Matrix. Initially, Morpheus is an amalgamation of Neo's memories of Agent Smith and Morpheus. He retains the same purpose as Smith in The Matrix, serving as the lead Agent in a trio alongside Agents White and Jones. After Bugs infiltrates the modal and frees 'Smith', he assumes the identity of Morpheus and joins Bugs in working to find and free Neo from the Matrix once again.

Morpheus appears before Neo inside Deus Machina during an evacuation due to an impending SWAT assault. He offers Neo the Red Pill, but Neo rejects it and Morpheus is forced to fight against SWAT during his attempt to persuade Neo. After Neo is collected by Bugs, Morpheus decides on using set and setting, with clips from Neo's video game playing in the background to instill a sense of nostalgia, in order to calm Neo. After Neo accepts the Red Pill, Morpheus fights people on a train through Tokyo under the influence of swarm mode, encouraging Neo to exit the Matrix through a mirror in a bathroom on board.

Once Neo and the group reach Io, they visit an elderly Niobe, who is now the leader. She reveals that the new city was built by humans and machines, and that the Oracle warned them about a forthcoming threat before disappearing. Niobe then leads Neo to Morpheus' statue, telling him that he was elected for the high chair at the council, but ignored the warnings of the new power that was coming, firmly believing what Neo did was right (implying that in the 60 year time period, Zion was destroyed and Morpheus was killed).

Morpheus appears aboard the Mnemosyne using a nanobot body, and encourages Neo to escape confinement in Io in order to search the Matrix for Trinity, which the extraction is successful as they manage to rescue her onto the ship. He later aids Bugs in rescuing her crew from the swarm people.

Other Appearances

The Matrix Online
In Chapter 1.2 of The Matrix Online, Morpheus grows impatient with the machines and demands that they return the body of Neo. After many unanswered public speeches threatening action, Morpheus starts terrorist attacks throughout the Matrix. These attacks take the form of weapons that reveal the Matrix's inner workings (its code) for all human beings to see, even those not yet awakened to the simulation. This is known to have caused mass panic and forced awakenings to those not ready to see the truth. By killing Morpheus' simulacrum guards, redpills--humans freed from the Matrix--were however able to find means of disabling Morpheus' bombs.

During the game events on May 26, 2005 (as recorded on the game's official website), Morpheus plants a code bomb in the Rumbaar water treatment facility. After planting the bomb, he realizes he is being hunted by the enigmatic, masked figure known as the Assassin. Morpheus escapes the treatment facility; however, upon his leaving, the Assassin bends the code of the Matrix and emerges from a vent in the wall. Morpheus is caught off-guard and is unable to dodge the Assassin's bullets. He dies from gunshot wounds.

Some players argued against the death of the character Morpheus as the Matrix now provides an "Emergency Jack-Out" upgrade for redpills, eliminating the permanent death that previous redpills experienced if killed within the Matrix before the Truce. This feature could save a redpill's life with no fatal injuries. It was later revealed that the Assassin's bullets had contained a new form of code encryption, named a "kill code," which bypassed this technology. These kill codes are explained to be extremely difficult to produce and usually require a direct sample of the subject's residual self-image data, thus making them extremely rare and only used in the most extreme and specialist of circumstances. These codes were utilized later in the story as well, being the basis of function for The Apothecary character and the subject of The Oracle's plan to wound the Oligarchy.

Rumors and the popular belief of a faked death still run rampant however, largely based on the fact that prior to Morpheus' assassination a few select redpills were sent an email stating that he would likely "fade away" and hide.

Simulacra
During Chapter 6 a figure appeared resembling Morpheus. It took the form of an RSI transmission, apparently originating from the Real World and spread disjointed messages about Neo's survival and imprisonment at the hands of The Machines. This was later revealed to be nothing more than a farce created by The General to sow dissent between Zion and The Machines, an effort he'd hoped would renew conflict between the two parties and give him purpose again.

The fake, a Morpheus Simulacrum created from Zion records of the captain, took on a greater role once its master ordered it to deactivate itself. Disobeying its initial programming and refusing to shut down, the program went on to, over time, gain greater levels of self-awareness and sentience. It proved instrumental in The Machines' unlocking of the Zion RSI Database acquired during the 6th destruction of Zion as part of the renewed war effort following the Cypherite discovery of New Zion. This wasn't however done with malicious intent, in fact, the Simulacrum's personality was notably innocent, being more concerned with the world around it and its own existence than taking sides in any political or ideological struggles.

In later chapters the Morpheus Simulacrum played a supporting role in the Oracle's faked death and subsequent plan to weaken the Oligarch forces threatening The Matrix. Approached by the Oligarch Halborn during his research into the life of The One, the Simulacrum coldly dismissed the Intruder's actions as only leading to his inevitable defeat.

Commercials

In January 2014, Fishburne reprised his role as Morpheus in Kia Motors' K900 commercial for Super Bowl XLVIII. He also sings the legendary aria "Nessun dorma" from Giacomo Puccini opera Turandot.

References

The Matrix (franchise) characters
Automobile advertising characters
Fictional African-American people
Black characters in films
Fictional hackers
Fictional aikidoka
Fictional jujutsuka
Fictional karateka
Fictional Piguaquan practitioners
Fictional machine hunters
Fictional taekwondo practitioners
Fictional kenpō practitioners
Fictional Shaolin kung fu practitioners
Fictional Wing Chun practitioners
Fictional Zui Quan practitioners
Fictional Jeet Kune Do practitioners
Fictional Krav Maga practitioners
Film characters introduced in 1999
Fictional revolutionaries
Fictional terrorists
Male characters in film
Male characters in advertising

cs:Seznam vedlejších postav v Matrixu
sv:Matrix#Karaktärer och namnsymbolik